Zakaria Sami Al-Sudani (born July 27, 1992) is a Saudi Arabian professional football player who plays a midfielder for Abha.

Career
On 3 July 2022, Zakaria Sami joined Abha on a three-year contract.

References

External links 
 

1992 births
Living people
Saudi Arabian footballers
Saudi Arabia youth international footballers
Al-Ahli Saudi FC players
Hajer FC players
Khaleej FC players
Al-Nahda Club (Saudi Arabia) players
Al-Shoulla FC players
Al Batin FC players
Abha Club players
Saudi First Division League players
Saudi Professional League players
Footballers at the 2014 Asian Games
Association football midfielders
Asian Games competitors for Saudi Arabia
20th-century Saudi Arabian people
21st-century Saudi Arabian people